Jehan de Lescurel (also Jehannot de l'Escurel) was a composer-poet of late medieval music. Jehan's extensive surviving oeuvre is an important and rare examples of the formes fixes before the time of Guillaume de Machaut; it consists of 34 works: 20 ballades, 12 rondeaus and two long narrative poems, diz entés. All but one of his compositions is monophonic, representing the end of the trouvère tradition and the beginning of the polyphonic ars nova style centered around the formes fixes.

Identity and career
Jehan de Lescurel is also known as Jehannot de l'Escurel. Very little is known of his life; the transmission, notation and circumstances of his works suggest he was active in the early 14th century, and his compositions's textual references indicate he was active in Paris. It has also be inferred that Jehan was the son of a merchant and probably received his musical training at the Notre Dame de Paris. For many years, scholars assumed he was the 'Jehan de Lescurel' who had been hung on 23 May 1304 along with three other young clerics of Notre Dame, including Oudinet Pisdoé, for "debauchery" and "crimes against women". Recent research has shown that "Jehan de Lescurel" was a rather common name in early fourteenth-century Paris, and there is no other clear link between the composer and cleric.

Music
His lyrical style unites him with the composers of the later period. The sole source for his music is the same manuscript (Paris, Bibliothèque nationale de France, MS français 146) which preserves the interpolated version of the Roman de Fauvel.

Most of his works are monophonic songs, in the style of the trouvères; only one of his 34 works is polyphonic, although he wrote other works which have not survived. The songs are virelais, ballades, rondeaux; they include word painting more in the style of the later 14th-century composers than those of the 13th century; they are simple, charming, and debauchery is not a prominent theme. Jehan also has two extant diz entés, length poems with music set only to the refrain text.

Works

Editions

References

Notes

Citations

Sources
Books

 
 
 
 
 

Journals and articles

  
 

Online

Further reading
 Mediabook "Songé .i. Songe" (Jehan de Lescurel. Songs and one of the Dits Entés: "Gracïeux temps") by theEnsemble Syntagma, dir. A.Danilevski, essay by E. Danilevski

External links
 
 
 Works by Jehan de Lescurel in the Medieval Music Database from La Trobe University

1304 deaths
French classical composers
French male classical composers
13th-century French composers
14th-century French poets
14th-century French composers
Medieval male composers
Ars nova composers
Year of birth unknown
Year of death unknown